Chiara Vincis (born 17 June 1995) is an Italian kickboxer and the current ISKA World Featherweight Freestyle champion.

She is the WKU European 60 kg champion, the 2017 FIS Savate World championship runner up and the 2019 FIS Savate World Champion.

She is the #1 female savate 56 kg fighter in the world, as of February 2020.

Kickboxing career
Chiara Vincis won the ISKA World Kickboxing Freestyle Featherweight Title with a unanimous decision win over Nahed Kharchi.

Vincis dropped a decision against Martine Michieletto during their fight at Iron Fight Vol3: Muay Thai Time.

She captured the WKU European 60 kg title with a decision win over Jessica Marazzi.

During Oktagon S Selection she managed a decision victory over Perla Bragagnolo.

She fought the future Glory champion Anissa Meksen for the ISKA K1 Bantamweight title, losing the fight by a unanimous decision.

During the International Fight Show 2017  she fought the WMO champion Cindy Silvestre. She won the fight by a unanimous decision.

Participating in the 2018 Italian Championship, she netted a win against Melissa Landini and Sara Falchetti to win the tournament.

During PRAETORIA FIGHT NIGHT Vincis participated in a four women tournament. In the semi finals she defeated Perla Bragagnolo, and in the finals she defeated Vittoria Di Mauro.

In June 2019 she challenged for the ISKA European title against Emma Gongora. She lost the fight by a unanimous decision.

At the end of 2019 Vincis fought Flora Yanga for the Savate World Championship. She won the title by a unanimous decision.

During the Ultimate Muay Thai event, Vincis faced the former Enfusion champion Aurore Dos Santos. She won the fight by a unanimous decision. Vincis faced Sveva Melillo during the Petrosyanmania event in early 2020. Melillo would win the fight by a unanimous decision.

Championships and accomplishments
International Sports Karate Association
ISKA World Featherweight Kickboxing Freestyle Championship
World Kickboxing and Karate Union
WKU European 60 kg Championship
Fight1
Fight1 Italian K1 Tournament Winner
Federation Internationale de Savate
 2017 FIS 56 kg World Championship Runner-up
 2019 FIS 56 kg World Championship Winner

Kickboxing record

|-  bgcolor="#FFBBBB"
| 7 Aug 2021 || Loss ||align=left| Niam Kinehan || Yokkao 50 || London, England || Decision || 5 || 3:00

|-  bgcolor="#FFBBBB"
| 1 Feb 2020|| Loss||align=left| Sveva Melillo || Petrosyanmania Gold Edition || Milan, Italy || Decision (Unanimous) || 3 || 3:00
|-
|-  bgcolor="#CCFFCC"
| 30 Nov 2019|| Win||align=left| Aurore Dos Santos || Ultimate Muay Thai|| Strasbourg, France || Decision (Unanimous) || 5 || 2:00
|-
|-  bgcolor="#CCFFCC"
| 26 Oct 2019|| Win||align=left| Flora Yanga || Petrosyanmania || Milan, Italy || Decision (Unanimous) || 5 || 2:00
|-
! style=background:white colspan=9 |
|-
|-  bgcolor="#FFBBBB"
| Jun 2018|| Loss||align=left| Emma Gongora || ISKA Title Fight || Milan, Italy || Decision (Unanimous) || 5 || 2:00
|-
! style=background:white colspan=9 |
|-
|-  bgcolor="#CCFFCC"
| May 2018|| Win||align=left| Vittoria Di Mauro || PRAETORIA FIGHT NIGHT || Aosta, Italy || Decision (Unanimous) || 3 || 3:00
|-
! style=background:white colspan=9 |
|-
|-  bgcolor="#CCFFCC"
| May 2018|| Win||align=left| Perla Bragagnolo || PRAETORIA FIGHT NIGHT || Aosta, Italy || Decision (Unanimous) || 3 || 3:00
|-
! style=background:white colspan=9 |
|-
|-  bgcolor="#CCFFCC"
| Apr 2018|| Win||align=left| Melissa Landini || Italian Championship || Rome, Italy || Decision (Unanimous) || 3 || 3:00
|-
! style=background:white colspan=9 |
|-
|-  bgcolor="#CCFFCC"
| Apr 2018|| Win||align=left| Sara Falchetti || Italian Championship || Rome, Italy || Decision (Unanimous) || 3 || 3:00
|-
! style=background:white colspan=9 |
|-
|-  bgcolor="#FFBBBB"
| Dec 2017|| Loss||align=left| Mathilde Migner || Final World Championship || France || Decision (Unanimous) || 3 || 3:00
|-
|-  bgcolor="#CCFFCC"
| 30 Sep 2017|| Win||align=left| Cindy Silvestre || International Fight Show 2017 || Loano, Italy || Decision (Unanimous) || 3 || 3:00
|-
|-  bgcolor="#CCFFCC"
| 21 Apr 2017|| Win||align=left| Sarah Surrel || SB 13 || Marseille, France || Decision (Unanimous) || 3 || 3:00
|-
|-  bgcolor="#FFBBBB"
| 8 Apr 2017|| Loss||align=left| Anissa Meksen || Victory World Series: Oktagon Torino || Torino, Italy || Decision (Unanimous) || 5 || 3:00
|-
! style=background:white colspan=9 |
|-
|-  bgcolor="#CCFFCC"
| 11 Mar 2017|| Win||align=left| Perla Bragagnolo || Oktagon S Selection || Alassio, Italy || Decision (Unanimous) || 3 || 3:00
|-
|-  bgcolor="#c5d2ea"
| 25 Feb 2017|| Draw||align=left| Alina Nita || La Notte Dei Gladiatori 5 || Lecce, Italy || Decision (Unanimous) || 3 || 3:00
|-
|-  bgcolor="#CCFFCC"
| 3 Dec 2016|| Win||align=left| Donatella Panu || Fight Code || Loano, Italy || Decision (Unanimous) || 3 || 3:00
|-
|-  bgcolor="#CCFFCC"
| 5 Nov 2016|| Win||align=left| Chiara Laurora || The Destroyers 2 || Milan, Italy || Decision (Unanimous) || 3 || 3:00
|-
|-  bgcolor="#FFBBBB"
| 23 Oct 2017|| Loss||align=left| Jacqueline Berroud || ? || Savona, Italy || Decision (Unanimous) || 5 || 3:00
|-
! style=background:white colspan=9 |
|-
|-  bgcolor="#CCFFCC"
| 8 Oct 2016|| Win||align=left| Cynthia Gonzalez || ? || Lorient, France || Decision (Unanimous) || 3 || 3:00
|-
|-  bgcolor="#CCFFCC"
| 18 Sep 2016|| Win||align=left| Jessica Marazzi  || ? || Biel/Bienne, Switzerland || Decision (Unanimous) || 5 || 3:00
|-
! style=background:white colspan=9 |
|-
|-  bgcolor="#CCFFCC"
| 7 Jul 2016|| Win||align=left| Michela Socci  || Seconds Out || Parma, Italy || Decision (Unanimous) || 3 || 3:00
|-
|-  bgcolor="#FFBBBB"
| 13 Mar 2016|| Loss||align=left| Martine Michieletto || Iron Fight Vol3: Muay Thai Time || Cogoleto, Italy || Decision (Unanimous) || 3 || 3:00
|-
|-  bgcolor="#CCFFCC"
| 20 Feb 2016|| Win||align=left| Nahed Kharchi || ISKA World Kickboxing title || Nice, France || Decision (Unanimous) || 5 || 3:00
|-
! style=background:white colspan=9 |
|-
|-  bgcolor="#CCFFCC"
| 19 Dec 2015|| Win||align=left| Chiara Sammicheli || ? || Savona, Italy || Decision (Unanimous) || 5 || 3:00
|-
! style=background:white colspan=9 |
|-
|-  bgcolor="#FFBBBB"
| 29 Nov 2016|| Loss||align=left| Veronica Vernocchi || Fight Code  || Loano, Italy || Decision (Unanimous) || 3 || 3:00
|-
|-
| colspan=9 | Legend:

See also
 List of female kickboxers
 FIS Savate World Championships

References 

Italian kickboxers

1995 births
Living people
People from Savona